Leopold of Bavaria may refer to:
 Prince Leopold of Bavaria (1846–1930), German field marshal and titular King of Greece
 Prince Leopold of Bavaria (born 1943), member of the Bavarian Royal House of Wittelsbach and retired racecar driver